Fourth County Courthouse may refer to any of numerous courthouses that were fourth-built in their county, including:

Washington County Courthouse (Illinois), Nashville, Illinois
Bond County Courthouse, Greenville, Illinois
Madison County Courthouse (Illinois), Edwardsville, Illinois

See also
Second County Courthouse (disambiguation)
Third County Courthouse (disambiguation)